Otter Pond may refer to the following: 

 Otter Pond (Colton, St. Lawrence County, New York)
 Otter Pond (Fine, St. Lawrence County, New York)
 Otter Pond (Hopkinton, St. Lawrence County, New York)